Point forward is a nontraditional position in basketball, with a small forward—or sometimes a power forward or combo forward—adding the responsibilities of point guard to their play.

Characteristics 
Generally, teams employ a point forward when their best playmaker is a forward rather than a guard. A point forward is typically responsible for bringing the ball up the court and being the primary facilitator on offense to generate assists, but they may merely direct play once a guard brings the ball up-court.

Assuming the role of point forward may cut down on that player's scoring, as distributing the ball to others decreases shot attempts.  Basketball Hall of Fame small forward Larry Bird, a prolific scorer with exceptional passing skills, quipped "I'm a point forward now" after his coaches sought him to score less and pass more.

Don Nelson, a coach often associated with the point forward in his Nellie Ball system, used the role when his guards were not strong ball-handlers.  Other coaches have used point forwards to free their guards to score more, a strategy of increasing importance as the three-point shot has become the sport's primary offensive weapon.

ESPN analyst Dave Telep maintained a point forward needed to be more than merely an adept passer but also had to facilitate the offense for teammates at least half of the time.

Etymology 
The origin of the term point forward is cloudy.  Two former members of the NBA's Milwaukee Bucks claim to have coined it: Bucks small forward Marques Johnson maintains he created it during the 1984 playoffs when the team became short on point guards after Nate Archibald was sidelined with a hamstring injury. When coach Don Nelson instructed Johnson to run the offense he says he responded, "OK, so instead of a point guard, I'm a point forward". Then-Bucks assistant coach Del Harris claims he first mentioned the term to Nelson while discussing how to best use Paul Pressey. Harris says he came up with the term while coaching Robert Reid with the Houston Rockets. Harris credits his predecessor as Rockets coach Tom Nissalke's use of small forward Rick Barry as originating the point forward position.

History 
Historically, one of the first to fill the role  was John Johnson, who played it for the 1970s Seattle SuperSonics alongside two scoring-minded guards, Gus Williams and Dennis Johnson. During the 1980s Milwaukee Bucks Marques Johnson and Paul Pressey played point forward under coach Don Nelson. Larry Bird, a 6'9" small forward who excelled at both scoring and rebounding in that position was also an exceptional passer and facilitator of others on offense.  In the flow of games, he often played a point forward role for the great Boston Celtics teams of the 1980s; the 6'9" Earvin "Magic" Johnson, who orchestrated the Los Angeles Lakers' offense in the 1980s as the team's point guard, moved to a point forward role upon returning  heavier after his HIV announcement.

See also
Tweener

References 

Basketball positions
Basketball terminology